Anatoli Koltuniewicz (born 16 November 1948) is an Australian basketball player. He competed in the men's tournament at the 1972 Summer Olympics.

References

External links
 

1948 births
Living people
Australian men's basketball players
1974 FIBA World Championship players
Olympic basketball players of Australia
Basketball players at the 1972 Summer Olympics
Place of birth missing (living people)